On 24 December 2015, at 08:35, an Airbus A310-304F cargo aircraft, operated by Congolese company Services Air on a domestic flight, ran off the end of the runway and crashed in a residential area while landing at Mbuji-Mayi Airport in the city of Mbuji-Mayi, the capital of Kasai-Oriental province in the Democratic Republic of Congo. Eight people were killed and nine others were injured, all of whom were people in the residential area. The aircraft suffered substantial damage, but the five crew members were uninjured.

Accident 
The pilot informed Ngoyi Kasanji, governor of Kasai-Oriental province, that a brake problem on the aircraft was the cause of the accident. According to witnesses the aircraft had already gone around twice and on the third landing attempt it touched down about halfway along the runway and was unable to stop before rolling off the end. The A310 came to a stop on soft ground among houses about  past the runway end.

References 

Services Air Airbus A310 crash
Services Air Airbus A310 crash
Aviation accidents and incidents in the Democratic Republic of the Congo
Accidents and incidents involving the Airbus A310
Services Air Airbus A310 crash
Mbuji-Mayi